Krishna and Radha in a Pavilion is an 18th-century rajput painting depicting the two Hindu deities Krishna and Radha engaged in sexual intimacy.

Description 
The painting is the example of pahari painting used in Gardner's Art Through the Ages, which states:

Art scholar Stuart Cary Welch calls it a prime example of "Mughal naturalism combined with the tender lyricism of local traditions and Vaishnavite poetry."

References

1760s paintings
Indian paintings
Erotic art
Religious paintings
Krishna in art
Hindu goddesses in art
Works of unknown authorship
Paintings in India